Personal record may refer to:

personal record
A Personal Record, autobiographical work (or "fragment of biography") by Joseph Conrad, published in 1912
Personal Record, an album by Eleanor Friedberger